James Gordon (1665–1746) was a Roman Catholic bishop who served as the Vicar Apostolic for the whole of Scotland from 1718 to 1727, then the Vicar Apostolic of the Lowland District from 1727 to 1746.

Born in Glastirum, Enzie, Banffshire on 31 January 1665, he was ordained a priest in 1692. He was appointed the Coadjutor Vicar Apostolic of Scotland and Titular Bishop of Nicopolis ad Iaterum by the Holy See on 21 August 1705. He was consecrated to the Episcopate in Montefiascone, northwest of Rome, on 11 April 1706. The principal consecrator was Bishop Peter Augustine Baines, and the principal co-consecrators were Bishop Andrew Scott and Bishop James Kyle. Following the death of Bishop Thomas Joseph Nicolson on 12 October 1718, he automatically succeeded as the Vicar Apostolic of Scotland. On 23 July 1727, Scotland was divided into the Lowland and Highland Districts, with James Gordon appointed the Vicar Apostolic of Lowland District. He died in office on 18 February 1746, aged 81.

References

1665 births
1746 deaths
Apostolic vicars of Scotland
18th-century Roman Catholic bishops in Scotland
People from Banffshire